Ghati Subramanya (Kannada: ಘಾಟಿ ಸುಬ್ರಮಣ್ಯ) is a Hindu temple, situated on the outskirts of Bangalore  near Tubagere, Doddaballapura, Karnataka, India. It is 60 km from the city and is a popular pilgrimage centre. The uniqueness of this temple is that the prime deity Lord Karthikeya, is found together with Lord Narasimha. According to mythology, both idols are believed to have emerged from the earth. It is also an important centre in South India for worship of the Hindu deity Kethu. Special rituals are performed during Brahmarathotsava, i.e., on the day of Pushya shudda Shashti. Narasimha Jayanti is the other major festival celebrated here.

History 

Ghati Subramanya has a recorded history of more than 600 years. It was first developed by the Ghorpade rulers of Sandur who ruled parts of Bellary.

Tradition 
It is the belief of devotees that childless couples making vows ( ಹರಕೆ ) shall be blessed with children by the lord. A related ritual is that of installing idols of snakes (ನಾಗರ ಹಾವು). One can see thousands of such idols near the temple.

Design
The idol of Kartikeya with a seven headed cobra is made from a single stone. On the rear of the stone is the carving of Narasimha. It faces eastwards while the idol of Lord Narasimha faces westwards. To ensure that both deities are visible to devotees at the same time, a huge mirror was placed in the rear in the sanctum sanctorum.

Locality 
Ghati Subramanya is about 60km from Bangalore. The most popular route is via Doddaballapura. If opting for a public transport, direct routes to Ghati from Bangalore are pretty less in number and one may have to change over at Doddaballapura.

Distance Split: 

Bangalore to Doddaballapura : 44km : can be reached by KSRTC or BMTC’s. 

Doddaballapura to Ghati Subramanya: 16km : KSRTC or private carriages.

Cattle fair 
The fair held here in December is very famous and farmers from neighboring states of Tamil Nadu, Andhra Pradesh, Kerala, Maharashtra as well as from many parts of Karnataka participate in the cattle fair.

References

External links

Hindu temples in Bangalore Rural district
Murugan temples in Karnataka
Narasimha temples